The 32nd Saturn Awards, honoring the best in science fiction, fantasy and horror film and television in 2005, were held on May 2, 2006 at the Universal City Hilton Hotel in Los Angeles. The host for the event was Jeffrey Ross.

The following is a complete list of nominees and winners. Winners are highlighted in boldface.

Winners and nominees

Film

Television

Programs

Acting

DVD

Special awards

Filmmaker's Showcase Award
 Shane Black

Rising Star Award
 Brandon Routh

George Pal Memorial Award
 Ray Harryhausen

References

External links
 The Official Saturn Awards Site

Saturn Awards ceremonies
Saturn
Saturn